Élisabeth-Claire Tardieu (1731-1773) was a French engraver.

Life and work
Tardieu was born in Paris in 1731. She worked as an engraver, creating reproduction engravings of Pierre Louis Dumesnil, François de Troy, Étienne Jeaurat and others. Her husband was Jacques-Nicolas Tardieu. She died in Paris in 1773.

Notable collections
L' Aimable Accord (Pleasant Harmony), Library of Congress
Le déjeuner de l'enfant, ca. 1748–1760, British Museum
Sweet Sleep, 1760-1770s, Hermitage Museum

References

1731 births
1773 deaths
Artists from Paris
18th-century French engravers
Women engravers
French women printmakers
18th-century French women artists